

The Men's road race cycling events at the 2004 Summer Paralympics were held at Vouliagmeni on 24 September.

There were three classes. Athletes with an impairment affecting their legs competed using a handcycle. Athletes with an impairment that affected their balance used a tricycle.

HC A

The handcycle HC Div A event was won by Rastislav Turecek, representing .

Results
24 Sept. 2004, 10:00

HC B/C

The handcycle Div B/C event was won by Johann Mayrhofer, representing .

Results
24 Sept. 2004, 10:00

CP 1/2

The tricycle CP Div 1/2 event was won by Mark le Flohic, representing .

Results
24 Sept. 2004, 14:20

References

Cycling at the 2004 Summer Paralympics
2004 in road cycling
Vouliagmeni Olympic Centre events